The 2021 Oakland Roots SC season is the club's third season of existence and first in the USL Championship. Prior to this, the team played two seasons in the third division National Independent Soccer Association.

Squad information
<div style="float:left; width:50%;">

First team squad

Coaching staff

Goal scorers

Disciplinary record

References

External links 

 

Oakland Roots
Oakland Roots SC
2020s in Oakland, California
Oakland Roots
2021